The seventh and final season of MacGyver, an American television series, began September 16, 1991, and ended on May 21, 1992. It aired on ABC. The region 1 DVD was released on October 24, 2006.

Episodes

References

External links 
 
 

1991 American television seasons
1992 American television seasons
MacGyver (1985 TV series) seasons